The 1805 Connecticut gubernatorial election took place on April 11, 1805. Incumbent Federalist Governor Jonathan Trumbull Jr. won re-election to an eighth full term, defeating Democratic-Republican candidate William Hart in a re-match of the previous year's election.

Results

References

Notes 

Gubernatorial
Connecticut
1805